Karacaoğlan River (or Karacaoğlan Creek) is a small river in Erdemli ilçe (district) of Mersin Province, Turkey. Its headwaters are around Tepeköy in the Toros Mountains. It has a number of names depending on the villages around such as; Şahna, Müğlü, Dikiner, Sandal, Kargıpınarı (or Gilindire; the former name of Kargıpınarı). In the lower reaches in Çukurova (Cilician) plains it is used for irrigation . During the post-rainy seasons its excess water falls down over the cliffs to create an artificial waterfall to the east of Elvanlı. The waterfall is a popular excursion area for Mersin citizens.

References

Rivers of Turkey
Landforms of Mersin Province
Erdemli District
Waterfalls of Turkey
Rivers of Mersin Province